Cottesloe, Western Australia is suburb of Perth.

Cottesloe may also refer to:

Australia
Cottesloe railway station, on the Transperth Fremantle line 
Town of Cottesloe, local government area and suburb of Perth

United Kingdom
Cottesloe Hundred, a former hundred in Buckinghamshire
Cottesloe School, formerly known as Wing County Secondary School, Wing, Buckinghamshire
Cottesloe Theatre, part of the Royal National Theatre at the South Bank Centre, London
Baron Cottesloe, a title in the peerage of the United Kingdom
Thomas Fremantle, 1st Baron Cottesloe (1798–1890), after whom Cottesloe, Western Australia was named
Thomas Fremantle, 2nd Baron Cottesloe (1830–1918), British businessman and Conservative politician
Thomas Fremantle, 3rd Baron Cottesloe (1862–1956), British peer and sportsman
John Fremantle, 4th Baron Cottesloe (1900–1994), (Lord Cottesloe), after whom the theatre was named
John Fremantle, 5th Baron Cottesloe (1927–2018), British baron

Elsewhere
Cottesloe, part of the township of Douro-Dummer, Ontario, Canada
Cottesloe, suburb of Johannesburg, South Africa